The 2007 Canada Winter Games were held in Whitehorse, Yukon, from Friday 23 February 2007 to Saturday 10 March 2007. These were the first Canada Games held North of 60 (in the northern territories). The games were held concurrent with the Inuit Games and Dene Games. The Games were televised by CBC, SRC, TSN, RDS, and APTN.

Opening Ceremonies
The opening ceremonies were held on Friday 23 February 2007, at ATCO Place, a temporary tent structure built adjacent to the Yukon River for the Games. The ceremonies were aired on CBC and the First Nations Channel, broadcast in English, French, and Inuktituk. The national anthem was sung twice, first in T'chone and then in the usual mixed-language English and French (starting in English, then changing language verse by verse). The premiers of Yukon, Nunavut, Northwest Territories and Prime Minister Stephen Harper officially opened the games.

Closing Ceremonies
The closing ceremonies were conducted 10 March 2007 at ATCO Place with 3500 in attendance to watch entertainment and hear closing speeches. Jennifer Knight, a skier from the Yukon, handed a torch to Hilary Hansen, an athlete from Prince Edward Island, host province of the 2009 Canada Games.

Sports Contested & Venues

Medal standings
Based on total medals won.

Records

No province or territory was denied a medal in the final standings, an unprecedented occurrence for the Canada Games.

See also
Shane Wilson

References

External links
 2007 Host City: Whitehorse, Yukon Territory
 Canada Winter Games Information, Detailed Venue Maps & Photos 
 CWG Pan Northern Torches and Relay: Video, Images and Info from Community Relays, Challenges and Main Ceremonies

! colspan="3" style="background:#78FF78;" | Canada Games

 
Canada Games
Winter multi-sport events in Canada
Sport in Yukon
Games
Canada Games
2007 in Yukon